PP-10 Rawalpindi-IV is a Constituency of Provincial Assembly of Punjab.

Election 2008

General elections were held on 18 February 2008. Raja Qamar Ul Isalm of  Pakistan Muslim League (Q) this seat by securing 34252 votes.

Election 2013
General elections were held on 11 May 2013. Qamar Ul Isalm Raja won this seat with 65445 votes.

All candidates receiving over 1,000 votes are listed here.

Election 2018

General elections are scheduled to be held on 25 July 2018. In 2018 Pakistani general election, Chaudhary Nisar Ali Khan an Independent politician won PP-10 Rawalpindi V election by taking 53,212 votes.

See also
 PP-9 Rawalpindi-III
 PP-11 Rawalpindi-V

References

External links
 Election commission Pakistan's official website
 

R